The 2016–17 PSA World Tour is the international squash tour organised circuit organized by the Professional Squash Association (PSA) for the 2016 squash season. It's the 2nd PSA season since the merger of PSA and WSA associations in 2015. The most important tournaments in the series is the Men's World Championship and the Women's World Championship. The tour features three categories of regular events, World Series, which feature the highest prize money and the best fields, International and Challenger. In the middle of the year, the PSA World Series tour is concluded by the Men's PSA World Series Finals and the Women's PSA World Series Finals in Dubai, the end of the world series season for the top 8 rated players.  Players performances in the tour are rated by the Men's World Rankings and Women's World Rankings.

Calendar
Categories: International tournaments and more.

Key

August

September

October

November

December

January

February

March

April

May

June

July

Statistical information

The players/nations are sorted by:
 Total number of titles;
 Cumulated importance of those titles;
 Alphabetical order (by family names for players).

Key

Titles won by player (men's)

Titles won by nation (men's)

Titles won by player (women's)

Titles won by nation (women's)

Retirements
Following is a list of notable players (winners of a main tour title, and/or part of the PSA Men's World Rankings and Women's World Rankings top 30 for at least one month) who announced their retirement from professional squash, became inactive, or were permanently banned from playing, during the 2016 season:

 Laurens Jan Anjema (born 1 December 1982 in The Hague, Netherlands) joined the pro tour in 1999, reached the singles no. 9 spot in 2010. He won 12 PSA World Tour titles including the Netsuite Open against Omar Mosaad and the Bluenose Classic against Borja Golán. He reached in 2010 the final of the US Open against Wael El Hindi. He retired in July after 15 years on the tour.

See also
Professional Squash Association (PSA)
2015–16 PSA World Series
2016–17 PSA World Series
Men's World Rankings
Women's World Rankings
PSA World Series Finals
PSA World Championship
2016 Women's World Team Squash Championships

References

External links
 PSA World Tour

PSA World Tour seasons
2016 in squash
2017 in squash